The word "Blastus" may refer to:
 Blastus, the chamberlain of Herod Agrippa in the Bible
 Blastus, a Roman presbyter in the late second century
 Blastus, a genus of plants in the family Melastomataceae
 Old Blastus of Bandicoot, a novel by Miles Franklin